Reedy Island is a small island in the middle of the channel of the Delaware River near its mouth on the Delaware Bay in the U.S. state of Delaware.

The island was the location of Reedy Island Range Front Light and the Reedy Island Quarantine Station. The Reedy Island Range Rear Light, in nearby Taylors Bridge, is a historic lighthouse first established in 1910. The light is operated by the United States Coast Guard. The nearby keeper's house was destroyed by arson in 2002.

See also
Pea Patch Island

External links
National Park Service: Reedy Island Range Rear Light
LighthouseFriends.com: Reedy Island Range Rear Light
Port Penn Area Historical Society: Reedy Island

Islands of Delaware
Landforms of New Castle County, Delaware
Islands of the Delaware River